Sper may refer to:

 Sper (Armenia), ancient Armenian region
 Sper (Georgia), ancient Georgian principality
 Sper (historical region), now part of the Eastern Anatolia region of Turkey
 South Pacific Electric Railway (SPER), which operates the Sydney Tramway Museum

See also
 Speer (disambiguation)
 Spear (disambiguation)